Derbyshire County Cricket Club in 1946 represents the first cricket season after a six-year break from first class cricket during  World War II. The English club Derbyshire had been playing for seventy five years. It was their forty-second season in the County Championship and they won five matches and lost thirteen to  finish fifteenth (two from bottom) in the County Championship.

1946 season

On the resumption of county cricket after the second world war in 1946 the main problem affecting Derbyshire was that of finding a regular captain. The convention was that the captain be an amateur and usually no one was available for more than one year. Gilbert Hodgkinson filled the role in 1946 and they made a poor re-entry to the County Championship . 
 
Wisden Cricketers' Almanack (1947 edition), in its review of the 1946 season, remarked that "the weather in 1946 might have been dreadful, but it didn't stop the crowds flocking to games".

Derbyshire began their season with a tour of Ireland. They played 26 games in the County Championship, and one match against the touring Indians. They won five matches altogether, and these wins came in a bright patch in the middle of the season. Denis Smith was top scorer and Cliff Gladwin took most wickets with 102. Pat Vaulkhard and Denis Smith's 4th wicket partnership of 328 against Nottinghamshire remains a record for the county.

The club retained a nucleus of pre-war players, and Pat Vaulkhard, a future captain, had previously played for Nottinghamshire. Alan Revill, Eric Marsh,  John Eggar and Roy Genders all began their first-class career during the season, although some had already played for the club in miscellaneous matches during the war. England footballer Raich Carter turned out for Derbyshire at cricket. However newcomers Walter Fullwood and Jack Pearson did not play beyond the end of the season, and John Tomlinson only played one match for the club in 1946.

Matches

Statistics

County Championship batting averages

County Championship bowling averages

Wicket Keepers
D Smith  Catches 32, Stumping 4
W Fullwood Catches 5, Stumping 1
P Vaulkhard Catches 15, Stumping 1

See also
Derbyshire County Cricket Club seasons
1946 English cricket season

References

1946 in English cricket
Derbyshire County Cricket Club seasons